Hukkok may refer to either of two cities in Israel:

The ancient village of Huqoq, later known as Yaquq
The kibbutz of Hukok